The Mariah Wright house is a structure within the Appomattox Court House National Historical Park. It was registered in the National Park Service's database of Official Structures on June 26, 1989.

History
The Mariah Wright house was constructed in 1823 by Pryor Wright.

It is associated with the site where the surrender of the Confederate Army under Robert E. Lee to Union commander Ulysses S. Grant took place on April 9, 1865 with their major commanders.

Historical significance

A marker near titled "Lee's Last Attack" says:"At a last council of war held on Saturday, April 8, Lee ordered Gordon's infantry and Fitzhugh Lee's cavalry to clear the stage road of Union cavalry. The Union horsemen were pushed back but arrival of bluecoated infantry again blocked the escape route. A flag of truce halted the fighting while General Lee negotiated the surrender of his army."

Description and architecture

The single story Mariah Wright House is topped with a gable roof and attic. The structure is roughly forty feet deep by eighteen feet wide. The west side of the house has a full length front porch and a central east porch of sixteen and a half feet by seven and a half feet. Both porches are on stone piers with wood shingle shed roofs. The house siding is beaded pine weatherboard.

The Mariah Wright House had an attached kitchen wing added around 1890. In 1965 the National Park Service restored the house, removing the kitchen wing and excavating a basement and full cement foundation. Extensive archeological investigations were conducted at this time and many artifacts were found.

Footnotes

Sources
 Marvel, William, A Place Called Appomattox, UNC Press, 2000,

Further reading

 Bradford, Ned, Battles and Leaders of the Civil War, Plume, 1989
 Carroll, Orville W., Historic Structures Report Part III, Architectural Data Section on Mariah Wright House, Appomattox Court House National Historical Park. Ms. on file, National park Service, Chesapeake and Allegheny Systems Support Office, Philadelphia, Pennsylvania, 1965
 Catton, Bruce, A Stillness at Appomattox, Doubleday 1953, Library of Congress # 53-9982, 
 Catton, Bruce, This Hallowed Ground, Doubleday 1953, Library of Congress # 56-5960
 Davis, Burke, The Civil War: Strange & Fascinating Facts, Wings Books, 1960 & 1982, 
 Davis, Burke, To Appomattox - Nine April Days, 1865, Eastern Acorn Press, 1992, 
 Farrar, Stuart McDearmon, Historical Notes of Appomattox County, Virginia, self-published by Farrar, 1989, Original from the University of Virginia
 Featherston, Nathaniel Ragland, Appomattox County History and Genealogy, Genealogical Publishing Company, 1998, 
 Fiero, Kathleen, Archeological Research Mariah Wright House Outbuildings, Historic Roads. National Park Service, Denver Service Center. Denver, Colorado, 1983
 Glassie,  Henry H., Vernacular Architecture, Indiana University Press, 2000, 
 Gutek, Patricia, Plantations and Outdoor Museums in America's Historic South, University of South Carolina Press, 1996, 
 Hosmer, Charles Bridgham, Preservation Comes of Age: From Williamsburg to the National Trust, 1926-1949, Preservation Press, National Trust for Historic Preservation in the United States by the University Press of Virginia, 1981
 Howard, Blair et al., The Virginia Handbook, Hunter Publishing, Inc, 2005, 
 Kaiser, Harvey H., The National Park Architecture Sourcebook, Princeton Architectural Press, 2008, 
 Kennedy, Frances H., The Civil War Battlefield Guide, Houghton Mifflin Company, 1990, 
 Korn, Jerry et al., The Civil War, Pursuit to Appomattox, The Last Battles, Time-Life Books, 1987, 
 Marvel, William, Lee's Last Retreat, UNC Press, 2006, 
 McPherson, James M., Battle Cry of Freedom, Oxford University Press, 1988,
 National Park Service, Appomattox Court House: Appomattox Court House National Historical Park, Virginia, U.S. Dept. of the Interior, 2002, 
 Schlegel, Marvin W. and Carroll, Orville W., Historic Structures Report Part I, Administrative, Historical, and Architectural Data Mariah Wright House, Appomattox Court House National Historical Park, National Park Service, Chesapeake and Allegheny Systems Support Office, Philadelphia, Pennsylvania, 1959
 Tidwell, William A., April '65: Confederate Covert Action in the American Civil War, Kent State University Press, 1995, 
 Tyler, Lyon Gardiner, Tyler's Quarterly Historical and Genealogical Magazine, 1952
 Weigley, Russel F., A Great Civil War: A Military and Political History, 1861-1865, Indiana University Press, 2000, 

Appomattox Court House National Historical Park
Houses in Appomattox County, Virginia
Historic district contributing properties in Virginia
Houses completed in 1823